Robert McFarland (born January 1, 1961) is a retired American football coach. He served as the head football coach at Stephen F. Austin State University from 2005 to 2006, compiling a record of 9–13.

Head coaching record

References

External links
 Louisiana Tech profile

1961 births
Living people
Clemson Tigers football coaches
East Carolina Pirates football coaches
Iowa State Cyclones football coaches
Junior college football coaches in the United States
Kent State Golden Flashes football coaches
Louisiana Tech Bulldogs football coaches
Stephen F. Austin Lumberjacks football coaches
UCF Knights football coaches
McNeese State University alumni
Sportspeople from Long Beach, California